Keeper of the Flame is an album by Dutch hard rock band Golden Earring, released in 1989. The album was not issued in the U.S.

Track listing
All songs written by Hay and Kooymans except where noted.

"Can Do That" – 4:23
"Too Much Woman (Not Enough Girl)" – 3:47
"One Word" – 4:27
"Keeper of the Flame" (Gerritsen, Hay) – 6:01
"Turn the World Around" – 5:32
"Circles" – 4:08
"Say My Prayer" – 4:14
"Distant Love" (Gerritsen) – 5:11
"Nighthawks" – 3:35
"My Killer My Shadow" – 6:09

Personnel
Rinus Gerritsen - bass, keyboard
Barry Hay - vocals
George Kooymans - guitar, vocals
Cesar Zuiderwijk - drums

Additional personnel
Jantien de Laaf - background vocals
Tijn Smit - keyboards
Jacques Van Pol

Production
Producer: Golden Earring
Mixing: John Sonneveld
Art direction: Richard Ottema
Design: Richard Ottema
Photography: Rick Arnold

Charts

References 

Golden Earring albums
1989 albums